Bahurupi Natya Sangstha is a Bengali theatre group of Mymensingh, Bangladesh. The group was founded on 1 June 1975. As of 2015, the group's managing director is Helalul Islam, and its secretary is Shahadat Hossain Khan Hilu.

Productions 
 Agunmukha
 Daye-daitwa (written by Malay Bhowmik)
 Kabi Priya, a dance-drama written by Sheikh Akram Ali about Kazi Nazrul Islam
 Shasthi
 Shahidera Kotha Boley (homage to language martyrs)
 Shyama (dance-drama)

References

Gallery 

Bengali theatre groups
Theatre companies in Bangladesh
Mymensingh
Organizations established in 1975
1975 establishments in Bangladesh